Trinity High School is a Roman Catholic college preparatory high school for girls located in River Forest, a suburb of Chicago, Illinois. Located in the Roman Catholic Archdiocese of Chicago, it was founded in 1918 by members of the Sinsinawa Dominican Sisters. Originally the school was built on the grounds of Rosary College, which is now Dominican University, but in 1926 the campus was relocated a few blocks away from the original site. Today, Trinity High School has an enrollment of 500 young women divided among four grade levels. Trinity students come from 45 zip codes and 144 different grade schools.

Academics
Trinity offers two types of curricula - college preparatory classes and International Baccalaureate classes. Trinity is officially affiliated with the International Baccalaureate Organization in Geneva, Switzerland, the premier global honors program. 2,041 schools in one hundred and twenty-nine countries are connected with IB schools at this time. Trinity boasts a 90% passing rate compared to the 80% global success rate. On average, 50% of the student body take IB courses. All classes are taught on the block scheduling scheme. The IB classes offered at Trinity include English (higher level); a history class including 20th century history of European conflicts and world dictators, as well as American and Canadian history (higher level); biology (higher level); art and design (higher or standard level); mathematical methods (standard level); mathematical studies (standard level); Spanish language (standard level); French language (standard level); Italian language (standard level); information technology in a global society (standard level); and film studies (standard level). Students may opt to go for certification in one or more subjects of their choice (IB Certificate Programme), or enter into the IB Diploma Programme. In each graduating class, approximately fifteen to twenty students complete the IB Diploma Programme, which involves taking six IB subjects, completing 150 hours of service in two years, writing a 4,000 word research paper on a subject of the student's choice, and completing a philosophy course known as "Theory of Knowledge." About half of the members of each graduating class receive certification in one or more International Baccalaureate classes after sitting for exams in May of each year. All students are required to take speech, health, keyboarding, computer applications, business, fine arts, and theology classes before graduating. Trinity has a well-developed fine arts curriculum, including classes in singing, acting, drawing, painting, and other styles of artistic expression. Many Trinity students receive recognition at regional art competitions each year.

Trinity students have the potential to graduate with 5.5 credits in math and 6.25 credits in science. Trinity students graduate with 32 credits. 100% of 2017 Trinity graduates were accepted into a college or university. The 127 young women in the class of 2017 received academic scholarships totaling over $23.5 million.

Student life

Athletics
All Trinity students are required to enroll in two years of physical education classes.  In addition, the school offers eleven sports, each with a varsity and a junior varsity level, to its young women.  These sports include basketball, bowling, cross country, golf, soccer, lacrosse, softball, swimming, tennis, track, volleyball, and ice hockey.

Trinity ice hockey players play under the Fenwick name. The team is combined with players who attend Guerin College Preparatory High School, Fenwick High School, York High School, OPRF High School, Taft High School, and Lane Tech.

Trinity's athletics are high acclaimed throughout Chicago. Many student-athletes who attended Trinity High School have continued their education and athletic careers at  D1, D2, and D3 universities.

Activities
Trinity High School offers over thirty extracurricular activities and clubs, ranging from academic clubs such as Math Team to service clubs such as the Environment Club and Youth Ending Hunger to fine arts clubs such as the Art Club, La Trinita Choir, ACapella Choir, Gospel Choir, and Le Regazze Choir. Trinity's monthly newspaper is called The Blaze, its yearbook is called The Wyndword, and its Media Club produces television broadcasts on WTHS.

Eligible Trinity students can be inducted into the National Honor Society, Spanish National Honor Society, French National Honor Society, Italian National Honor Society, Quill and Scroll, and the International Thespian Society, typically in their junior year.

99% of Trinity's student body participates in a sport, club, or other co-curricular activity.

Notable alumni
Anne Walsh Willer, Illinois state representative

References

External links
Trinity High School website

Dominican schools in the United States
Girls' schools in Illinois
River Forest, Illinois
Roman Catholic Archdiocese of Chicago
Catholic secondary schools in Illinois
Educational institutions established in 1918
Private high schools in Cook County, Illinois
1918 establishments in Illinois